Dweepu is a 1977 Indian Malayalam film, directed by Ramu Kariat. The film stars Jose, Shobha, Kuttyedathi Vilasini and Alleppey Ashraf in the lead roles. The film has musical score by M. S. Baburaj.

Plot
Chandran, who is from a poor family, struggles to earn a living. However, his life takes a turn when he gets a job as a teacher in Lakshadweep.

Cast

Jose as Chandran
Shobha 
Kuttyedathi Vilasini 
Alleppey Ashraf 
Prathapachandran as Chandran's Father
Aboobacker as Hassan
Baby Ambika
KPAC Premachandran
Kedamangalam Ali
Lakshmisre 
Prathima
 Salim Raj
 Abbas
 Surabhi Sundhar
 Bhasi K Nair
 Dr. Madhavan Nair
 Shafi
 Ani
 Geetha
 Anna
 Eenashu
 Vijaykumar
 Prasad
 Paravanna
 P.C George

Soundtrack
The music was composed by MS Baburaj and the lyrics were written by Vayalar Ramavarma and Yusufali Kechery.

References

External links
 

1977 films
1970s Malayalam-language films
Films directed by Ramu Kariat
Films scored by M. S. Baburaj